Liyeh (also Romanized as Līyeh; also known as Leah and Leakh) is a village in Deylaman Rural District, Deylaman District, Siahkal County, Gilan Province, Iran. At the 2006 census, its population was 144, in 40 families.

References 

Populated places in Siahkal County